Scandinavia has a long and proud tradition of rug-making on par with many of the regions of the world that are perhaps more immediately associated with the craft—regions such as China and Persia. Rugs have been handmade by craftspeople in the Scandinavian countries of Denmark, Finland, Norway, and Sweden for centuries, and have often played important cultural roles in each of these countries. Contemporary Scandinavian rugs—most especially Swedish rugs—are among the most sought after rugs in the world today, largely due to the contributions of designers like Marta Maas-Fjetterstrom. The story of Scandinavian rugs is a vital chapter in the cultural study of Scandinavia, as it reveals a great deal about the aesthetic and social conventions of that region.

History 
The history of rug-making in Scandinavia is complex. Indeed, the history of how artisanal rug-making became a cultural institution throughout Scandinavia is very much the history of how the craft spread throughout the whole of Europe, from its origins as a traditional Eastern art form. Indeed, the rug-makers of Scandinavia – like many of their other European counterparts – were heavily influenced by the aesthetics as well as the manufacturing techniques of the rug-makers of Anatolia and Asia Minor, with whom the Scandinavians of the Early Middle Ages had considerable contact via international trade routes. By the tenth century of the Common Era, Scandinavians were trading extensively with the Byzantine Empire in Constantinople, creating a considerable interest in fine rugs throughout Scandinavia.

Between the right and twelfth centuries of the Common Era, a large preponderance of traditionally made Byzantine rugs were brought into Northern Europe – including into the Scandinavian Kingdoms of Denmark, Norway and Sweden. Because of those countries' harsh climate, which frequently counts among the coldest and bitterest winters anywhere on Earth, the expertly crafted rugs of the Byzantines fit right in: the best Byzantine rugs were often hung in stately homes for insulation purposes and were frequently used as blankets by Scandinavian noblemen. For a long time, it was this arrangement that dominated in Scandinavia: Oriental rugs were brought in from the Eastern Empire into Scandinavia, with very few original pieces actually being woven in Scandinavia. However, after centuries of exposure to fine Oriental rugs, the people of Scandinavia began to develop their own distinct style of artisanal rug-making.

By the fourteenth century A.D., Scandinavians had developed the art of the Rya (or Ryijy). These distinctive rugs represented a new development in the art form that told the story of the artisans responsible for them: unlike the Oriental rugs of the Eastern Empire to which the Scandinavians had become accustomed, Ryas were made thick with shaggy, long pile: these rugs were specifically engineered to help the Scandinavian people weather their notoriously harsh winters. Soon after their development, Ryas were everywhere in Middle Ages Scandinavia, often replacing traditional Oriental rugs as well as cloaks and blankets. Splendid examples of this sort of tug have been found at archaeological excavations of old Viking settlements, most notably in York, England.

In addition to serving as wall coverings and blankets for noblemen and commoners alike, traditional Ryas were also used in marriage ceremonies throughout Scandinavia, throughout the Middle Ages. Ryas woven for such occasions are very distinct pieces, often featuring the initials of the bride and the groom, the date of the wedding ceremony, a set of double hearts, and symbols and signs that represented the groom’s and the bride’s families. Wedding Ryas were extremely important, and perhaps represent the most distinct development in Scandinavian rug-making.  

Even as the Scandinavian rug-making tradition matured from the 1500s through the 1800s, more traditionally Oriental themes were incorporated into the finest Scandinavian rugs, with the Tree of Life motif featuring most prominently. A standby in Persian rugs, the Tree of Life symbol was adapted by the rug-makers of Scandinavia to represent family trees and ties.

By the 1880s, traditional Scandinavian rugs – and, most especially, Ryas – were hugely popular throughout northern Europe. In addition, Sweden had begun to produce a very distinctive style of rug, the Rollakan. These pieces were generally flat-woven rugs bedecked with elaborate tapestry art, making them very distinctive from the generally abstract, thick-piled Ryas – even as they were used for similar purposes. 

From humble beginnings, the craft of rug-making in Scandinavia has blossomed into a complex art form with various outlets for craftspeople to explore. And though Rya rugs fell out of favor with the nobles of Scandinavia and were subsequently relegated to the domain of folk art, there was a massive explosion in the popularity of the traditional Rya rug in the middle years of the twentieth century – a phenomenon that continues on today. 

Ryas had been made with abstract, geometric designs for centuries, and had always been made with thick shaggy pile. This design style was particularly appealing to the modernist designers of mid-twentieth-century Europe and North America, who felt that shaggy, colorful carpets worked well to offset the harsher and colder design elements that dominated their own aesthetic: in a home with many straight lines, hard woods, and metals, the soft and colorful design style of Rya rugs gave a sense of warmth and color that often worked to create a homier house. Designers as influential as Ray Eames, Le Corbusier, and Frank Lloyd Wright, were all known to enjoy the effect of a traditional Scandinavian rug.

Rug making techniques 

The art of rug-making is ancient and extraordinarily complex – not to mention culturally significant to the peoples among whom such traditions developed. The complicated lists of knot-types and weaving techniques long employed by the master weavers of China and Persia are indicative of the importance of rug-making to those cultures. Though rug-making came to Scandinavia notably later than it did to traditional rug-making cultures in the Eastern world, an equally complex and sophisticated methodology for weaving fine rugs did develop in those northern European countries.  

Rya rugs, for example, are woven with a combination of techniques that include weaving tapestry, needlework, and carpet knots. Traditionally, Scandinavian Rya rugs were hand-made by artisans who would add symmetric Turkish (or Ghiordes) knots directly to the warp through a specially woven backing. Small holes in the weave allowed the rug-makers to insert evenly spaced knots using a larger tapestry needle.  

Unlike many other culturally important rugs, Ryas were used with the pile facing downward, the better to insulate the wearer. As such, design elements and  ornamentation were woven into the back of the rugs, with the pile consisting of solid colors. Over time, this was reversed, creating the colorful Ryas that caught the eye of the mid-twentieth century designers who did so much to popularize them. 

It is difficult to talk about the history and style of Scandinavian rugs without mentioning Marta Maas-Fjetterstrom. One of the most important figures in the entire history of Scandinavian rug-making, Marta Maas-Fjetterstrom was a mid-twentieth century rug designer whose pieces are among the most noteworthy rugs ever designed.  Working from 1919 until her death in 1941, Maas-Fjetterstrom focused on creating rugs that communicated the intimacy of the natural world through a modernist approach to lines and geometric figures. With pieces in some of the most exclusive art museums in the world and an outsized reputation in the design world more than 70 years after her death, Maas-Fjetterstrom’s accomplishments illustrate the importance of Scandinavian rugs.

Modern design trends 

Due largely in part to the influence of Marta Maas-Fjetterstrom, Scandinavian rugs have remained hugely popular over the past 70 years. Indeed, since her death in 1941, the demand for rugs made after her distinctive style has risen meteorically. Maas-Fjetterstrom, upon her death, left to posterity more than 700 designs for rugs, along with meticulously detailed instructions for how to make them, including the different techniques that should be utilized in their manufacture. In addition to an enormous body of her own original work, Maas-Fjetterstrom also inspired a great many artists whose rugs are hugely desirable all over the world.

Rug designed by artists such as Ann-Mari Forsberg, Barvro Nilsson, Marianne Richter, and others are available, and are hand-made in Maas-Fjetterstrom’s original studio in Båstad, where rugs have been hand-made since 1919. It is difficult to overstate the influence that these designers and their works have had on the world of interior design. Even as tastes have changed since the 1920s and 1930s when Maas-Fjetterstrom herself was designing rugs, there is a quality to Scandinavian rugs that has intrigued leading designers and decorators for decades. If there is any one trend in the world of artisanal rugs, it is the increasing popularity of Scandinavian rugs.

Many mid-twentieth century designers, interior decorators, and modern visionaries have been impressed by the uniquely sparse and geometric composition of traditional Scandinavian rugs, and most especially by those designed by Maas-Fjetterstrom and her peers. The attention to detail and treatment of color in Maas-Fjetterstrom rugs—as well as the approach to geometry and line theory in the most well-known pieces—combine to create just the sort of piece that perfectly complements the design aesthetic of individuals such as Ray Eames, Le Corbusier, and Frank Lloyd Wright. A large reason behind the tremendous popularity enjoyed by mid-century Scandinavian rugs is the heavy incorporation of such pieces into these individuals' own design work.

Galleries and design studios throughout the world have recently begun to invest heavily in those Scandinavian rugs that are considered to be the best and the most representative of the aesthetic values of the famous mid-century modern Scandinavian rug-makers and designers. Galleries that specialize in antique rugs, such as the Nazmiyal collection in New York City, buy and sell a tremendous amount of Scandinavian rugs, underscoring the growing popularity of such pieces and the increased public demand for Scandinavian rugs. The increased demand for such rugs by galleries and studios is tied to a very real increased demand from decorators, collectors, and consumers.

The growing influence of Scandinavian rug-makers is an affirmation of the importance of the craft to the Swedish people. While not an artistic tradition of Scandinavian origin, rug-making has become a very important avenue of artistic expression in Scandinavia. As the taste for Scandinavian carpets and rugs continues to grow throughout the world, Scandinavian rug-makers will continue to produce unique and enduring works that represent those design elements and aesthetic ideals most important to the culture of the region.

See also
List of Scandinavian textile artists

References 

Textile arts
Scandinavian culture
Textile arts of Norway